Smith Clark was a lawyer and legislator in 19th-century Connecticut.

A lifelong lawyer in his home town of Haddam, Connecticut, Clark also served as a probate court judge.

Clark was a representative from Haddam in the Connecticut General Assembly for a single term.  In January 1827, Clark took the seat of George W. Smith and served alongside Simon Shailor through that June.  Clark's seat was picked up by Charles Arnold the following February.

On September 12, 1876, Clark died at the age of 84; he was survived by one son.

References

External links
 

1790s births
1876 deaths
19th-century American lawyers
19th-century American politicians
Connecticut lawyers
members of the Connecticut General Assembly
people from Haddam, Connecticut
Yale College alumni